The Plant Varieties and Seeds Act 1964 is an Act of the Parliament of the United Kingdom passed to allow regulation of the sale of plants. It was enacted for the UK to comply with its obligations as a member of International Union for the Protection of New Varieties of Plants.

In 1968, the Act was further modified to prohibit plant breeders to sell goods under any other name aside from what was registered with the Registrar of Plant Variety Rights. This raised criticism in Parliament because the Register only accepted certain types of names and stopped breeders from being able to sell plants under double names.

In 1997, the Act was revised in order to align with terms outlined by the European Union, which came into effect on 8 May 1998. The Act was brought into question again by the European Union in September 2013 because of the complexity and diversity of existing laws, to be replaced by the EU Regulation of Plant Reproductive Material. Writing in The Guardian, Graham Spencer was strongly critical of the changes, claiming they would affect over 50,000 varieties of plants and make it extremely difficult and expensive for farmers to go through the correct process of registering the name.

References

United Kingdom Acts of Parliament 1964
Agriculture legislation in the United Kingdom